This Is What I Do is an album by jazz saxophonist Sonny Rollins, released on the Milestone label in 2000, featuring performances by Rollins with Clifton Anderson, Stephen Scott, Bob Cranshaw, Jack DeJohnette and Perry Wilson.

Reception
The AllMusic review by Alex Henderson states: "This Is What I Do falls short of essential, but it offers some nice surprises and is a rewarding addition to Rollins' huge catalog." The Penguin Guide to Jazz gave it a maximum four-star rating and classified it as part of its core collection, stating: "This Is What I Do is unmistakable, and great Sonny Rollins." The album won a 2001 Grammy Award for Best Jazz Instrumental Album.

Track listing
All compositions by Sonny Rollins except where noted.
 "Salvador" – 7:55
 "Sweet Leilani" (Harry Owens) – 7:01
 "Did You See Harold Vick?" – 9:19
 "A Nightingale Sang in Berkeley Square" (Eric Maschwitz, Manning Sherwin) – 8:06
 "Charles M." – 10:19
 "Moon of Manakoora" (Frank Loesser, Alfred Newman) – 5:44

Recorded at Clinton Recording Studios, New York City, on May 8 & 9, 2000, except tracks 3 & 5, recorded on July 29.

Personnel

Musicians
Sonny Rollins – tenor saxophone
Clifton Anderson – trombone (except tracks 1 & 6)
Stephen Scott – piano
Bob Cranshaw – electric bass
Jack DeJohnette – drums (except tracks 3 & 5)
Perry Wilson – drums (tracks 3 & 5)

Production
Troy Halderson – recording engineering
Mark Fraunfelder – recording assistance
Jeremy Welsh – recording assistance
Richard Corsello – remixing engineering
George Horn – mastering
Jamie Putnam – art direction, design
John Abbott – photography (including cover)
Steve Maruta – photography

References

2000 albums
Milestone Records albums
Sonny Rollins albums
Grammy Award for Best Jazz Instrumental Album